Juliette Bossu  is a French retired gymnast.

In 2015 Bossu competed in the 2015 European Youth Summer Olympic Festival in Tbilisi. Bossu a two time gold medalist at the 2016 and 2017 French Gymnastics Championships appeared at four national championships and won a total of five medals. In 2018 Bossu won silver in artistic gymnastics at the 2018 European Championships in Glasgow.

At the French Nationals in May 2018, Bossu competed only on uneven bars, winning silver in the event final.  In September, she competed at the Paris World Cup, winning the gold medal on the uneven bars. She was named to the French team for the World Artistic Gymnastics Championships in Doha, Qatar in late October. She again only competed on uneven bars and contributed to France's fifth-place finish in the team final. After Doha, she competed at the Cottbus World Cup in Germany in November, but didn't make the event finals. On August 10, 2019 Bossu announced her retirement on her Instagram.

Medal table

References 

Year of birth missing (living people)
Living people
Sportspeople from Mulhouse
French female artistic gymnasts